Milič or Milíč may refer to:

 Jan Milíč (died 1374), Czech Catholic priest and Bohemian reformer
 Marko Milič (born 1977), Slovenian basketball player
 Milič Čapek (1909–1997), Czech–American philosopher

See also
 Miliči
 Milic (disambiguation)